The White Shepherd is a variety of the German Shepherd bred in the United States. Although white-coated German Shepherds have been known in Europe as early as 1882, in 1933 the breed standard was amended in their native Germany, banning white-coated dogs from registration. In the United States and Canada the coloration had gained a following and in 1969 a breed club was formed specifically for white-coloured German Shepherds, calling their variety the White Shepherd. The variety is recognized as a separate breed by the United Kennel Club.

The breed standard states they have a straight, dense, weather-resistant double coat that ideally is pure white, although light cream or light tan is acceptable.

See also
 Dogs portal
 List of dog breeds
 White Swiss Shepherd Dog

References 

Herding dogs
Dog breeds originating in the United States